Jakub Wilk (born 11 July 1985 in Poznań) is a Polish professional footballer who plays as a left midfielder for Wiara Lecha.

Career
He is one of the youngest players to make their debut in Ekstraklasa. He started playing for SKS 13 Poznań in 2002. He played for Lech Poznań II from 2003 until the fall of 2005. He was then promoted to the first team roster.

On 27 January 2012, he was loaned out to Lechia Gdańsk until the end of the 2011–12 season. On 25 February 2013, Wilk signed a contract with Lithuanian side Žalgiris Vilnius. In half-a-season in Vilnius, Wilk has played 20 matches, scoring 7 goals and having 13 assists.

National team
He debuted for Poland in a friendly versus Lithuania in February 2009.

Honours

Club
Lech Poznań
 Ekstraklasa (1): 2009–10
 Polish Cup (1): 2008–09
 Polish Super Cup (1): 2009

Žalgiris Vilnius
 A Lyga (2): 2013, 2014
 Lithuanian Cup (3): 2012–13, 2013–14, 2014–15
 Lithuanian Supercup (1): 2013

Statistics

Club

1 Including Ekstraklasa Cup, Polish SuperCup and Lithuanian Supercup.

References

External links
 
 
 

1985 births
Living people
Footballers from Poznań
Polish footballers
Poland international footballers
Polish expatriate footballers
Association football midfielders
Lech Poznań II players
Lech Poznań players
Lechia Gdańsk players
FK Žalgiris players
FC Vaslui players
Zagłębie Sosnowiec players
Bytovia Bytów players
Ekstraklasa players
A Lyga players
Liga I players
I liga players
III liga players
Expatriate footballers in Lithuania
Polish expatriate sportspeople in Lithuania
Expatriate footballers in Romania
Polish expatriate sportspeople in Romania